Francisco Llorens Díaz (10 April 1874, La Coruña - 11 February 1948, Madrid) was a Spanish-Galician painter; best known for still-lifes and landscapes.

Biography 
He was born to a family of merchants. While obtaining a commercial education, he began taking classes in drawing at the School of Arts and Crafts in La Coruña, where his teacher was the military artist, . This led him to choose painting over business as a career, so he moved to Madrid and enrolled at the Real Academia de Bellas Artes de San Fernando and studied with Carlos de Haes. He completed his initial training in the workshops of Joaquín Sorolla.

This included several months of intense study in Bruges, a city which made a great impression on him. Three of the works he created in Rome were acquired by the Spanish ambassador for display in the Quirinal Palace. He returned to Spain in 1906.

He also had showings at exhibitions in Panama and Buenos Aires, but never actually visited America. At the National Exhibition of Fine Arts of 1922, he was awarded a First Class prize for his landscape, "Rías Baixas". In 1929, he was commissioned to organize the Galician pavilion at the Ibero-American Exposition.

In 1918, he married Eva Rodríguez; daughter of a prominent physician in La Coruña. She died in 1925, leaving him with two daughters. Shortly after, he was awarded the Grand Cross of the Order of Charles  III.

During the Spanish Civil War, he remained in Madrid until 1938, when he and his daughters fled to Valencia with the Republican army. There, he devoted himself to painting still-lifes. After the war, he divided his time between Madrid and Galicia, where he created landscapes. In 1942, he was named an Academician at his alma mater, the Real Academia. The following year, he received similar honors at the Real Academia Gallega. 

In 1945, his health began to decline, and he suffered from episodes of severe memory loss. He died in 1948, and was buried next to his wife.

In 1972, a major retrospective was presented in Madrid, followed by exhibitions in La Coruña and Vigo. The Museo del Prado possesses eight of his works.

References

External links
 More works by Llorens @ ArtNet

1874 births
1948 deaths
Spanish painters
Painters from Galicia (Spain)
Spanish landscape painters
Spanish still life painters
People from A Coruña
Real Academia de Bellas Artes de San Fernando alumni